Maria Martinez (1887–1980) was a Native American artist and potter.

Maria Martinez may also refer to:

 María Martínez (fencer) (born 1983), Venezuelan fencer
 María Martínez (footballer) (born 1999), Paraguayan footballer
 María Isabel Martínez (born 1967), former field hockey player from Spain
 María Sornosa Martinez (born 1949), Spanish politician and Member of the European Parliament
 María José Martínez Sánchez (born 1982), Spanish tennis player
 María Martínez Santillán (born 1963), Mexican politician
 Marie Seznec Martinez, French stylist and fashion model
 Maria Elena Martinez, historian of colonial Mexico
 Maria Ramita Martinez, Picuris Pueblo potter
 Maria Martínez (singer), Cuban guitarist and singer
 María Antonia Martínez, Spanish politician
 María Martínez (volleyball), Colombian volleyball player
 María Rosa Martínez, Argentine trade unionist and politician
 María Dolores Martínez (born 1970), Spanish weightlifter
 María Belen Martínez, Argentine weightlifter